Angel wings are a traditional sweet crisp pastry made out of dough that has been shaped into thin twisted ribbons, deep-fried and sprinkled with powdered sugar. Common to many European cuisines, angel wings have been incorporated into other regional cuisines (such as American cuisine) by immigrant populations. They are most commonly eaten in the period just before Lent, often during Carnival and on Fat Thursday, the last Thursday before Lent – not to be confused with "Fat Tuesday" (Mardi Gras), the day before the start of Lent (Ash Wednesday). There is a tradition in some countries for husbands to give angel wings to their wives on Friday the 13th in order to avoid bad luck.

Ingredients
Ingredients used in the preparation of angel wings typically includes flour, water, egg yolk, confectioners' sugar, rectified spirit or rum, vanilla and salt.

Alternate names
In the various national cuisines, angel wings are referred to as:

 Bashkurt: ҡош теле (kush tili: "bird tongue")
 Belarusian: хрушчы (chruščy) or фаворкі (favorki)
  (favorki)
 Chilean Spanish: calzones rotos ("torn panties")
 , kroštule
 Czech: boží milosti
 Danish: klejner
 
 
 Greek: diples (δίπλες)
 
 Italian: chiacchiere ("chatter"), bugie ("lies"), cenci ("rags"), crostoli, frappe, galani, grostoli, sfrappole, nocche
 Judeo-Spanish - fiyuelas, fazuelos
 Latvian - žagariņi, zaķauši ("rabbit ears")
 Latgalian - žagareni
 Lithuanian: žagarėliai ("twigs", "sticks")
 Maltese: xkunvat
 Norwegian: fattigmann ("poor man")
 Tibetan cuisine: Khapse or Khapsey
 Polish: faworki, chruściki, chrusty 
 Portuguese: orelha de gato, cueca virada, filhós, coscorão, cavaquinho, crostoli 
 Romanian: minciunele, uscatele, regionally: cirighele
 Russian: хворост (khvorost: twigs, sticks), sometimes called Russian twig cookies.
 Russian-Canadian Doukhobor dialect: орешки (oreshki: nuts)
 Slovak: fánka, čeregi
 Slovenian: flancati
 Spain: pestiños
 Swedish: klenäter
 Tatar: кош теле (kush tili: "bird tongue")
 Ukrainian: вергуни (verhuny)
 Uzbek: qush tili ("bird tongue")
 Yiddish: כרוסט

Variants

Bulgaria 

In Bulgaria, angel wings are called kukurini, and are only found in Bansko, south-east Bulgaria. They are typically sprinkled with powdered sugar.

Croatia  
Kroštule is a traditional pastry from Dalmatia and Istria. It is made by deep frying dough.

France

In France, the fried pastry are made in central-eastern France, including Lyon and Saint-Étienne, and are closely related to beignets. Traditionally, Lyon cold meat shops sold bugnes just before Lent, due to their high fat content. They are also made in the home as a way of using surplus cooking fat, which would be wasted during Lent. More recently, bakeries make them, respecting more or less the tradition of Lent.

French bugnes varieties include crunchy bugnes and soft bugnes. The crunchy variety, known as bugnes lyonnaises ("Lyon bugnes"), are cooked in very hot oil with the dough spread out thinly and knotted once or twice. The soft variety, sometimes known as "pillows", are made with a thicker dough, which is rarely knotted.

Hungary
Hungarian csöröge are made from egg yolk, flour, a leavening agent, sugar, salt and cognac or brandy. They are deep fried and sprinkled with powdered sugar. They are traditional at weddings.

Italy

Italian chiacchiere are eaten at Carnival time. Their various regional names include: frappe (a name shared with similar treats) in Rome and Lazio; sfrappole in Emilia Romagna; bugie in Genoa and Piedmont; and galani or crostoli in Veneto and Friuli-Venezia Giulia. Fritte and many other regional names exist. Regional variations in the recipe include sprinkling with citrus zest, typically orange or lemon, or using anisette wine as the alcoholic base. It is very common in Italian families to make them at home. They often accompany the similarly famous "castagnole".

Lithuania
“Žagarėliai” are the equivalents of Angel Wings in Lithuania. 

Žagarėliai (or “small sticks” in English) are delicate pastry dough cookies, deep fried in fat. It is best to use lard or oil for deep frying these cookies.

Skruzdėlynas translates as “anthill” in English and is layers of fried dough strips, covered in honey and topped with poppy seeds. It is a typical dessert served during Lithuanian family celebrations.

Poland
Faworki and chrusty are the plural forms of the words faworek and chrust respectively.

The Polish word faworki was the name reserved for colourful ribbons attached to either female or male clothing, especially ribbons given to medieval knights by their ladies. Etymologically the word faworki came to Poland from the French word faveur, meaning 'grace' or 'favour'.

The Polish word chrust means 'dry branches broken off trees' or 'brushwood'. Chruścik is a diminutive of chrust.

Ukraine

Verhuny are sweet cookies, fried in lard, which have the form of oblong strips. Verhuny are a Ukrainian confectionery with non-yeast dough, which includes flour, butter, eggs, sugar and additives such as alcohol (rum, brandy or horilka) or, in extreme cases, vinegar (vinegar sometimes together with alcohol). As substitute for butter, but more often as an additional component in verhuny, milk products (milk, smetana i.e. sour cream, or cream) are added. Traditionally, Ukrainian verhuny should only be fried in lard.

United States
In the United States, many ethnic bakeries in the cities of Cleveland, Chicago, Buffalo, and Detroit make angel wings, and they are especially popular during the holidays of Easter and Christmas. During those holidays, some bakeries require people to pre-order their angel wings.

See also

Maejap-gwa, a similarly shaped Korean pastry
List of fried dough foods

References

Carnival foods
Catholic cuisine
Cuisine of Auvergne-Rhône-Alpes
French pastries
Hungarian desserts
Italian desserts
Lithuanian desserts
Russian desserts
Ukrainian desserts
Doughnuts
Fried dough